Carolinda Witt (born 1955 in Kenya) is an author, former commercial hot-air balloon pilot and competitor. She is also a teacher and expert on The Five Tibetans, an ancient yoga methodology originally described by Peter Kelder in his book "The Eye Of Revelation." Her step-by-step method of learning the Rites has made these five ancient movements more accessible to a broader range of practitioners.

Published Works 

 The Illustrated Five Tibetan Rites. (UnMind Pty Ltd, June 2006)  
 The Five Tibetan Rites: Ancient Anti-Aging Secrets of the Five Tibetan Rites with Peter Kelder.  (UnMind Pty Ltd, January 2014)  
 T5T: The Five Tibetan Exercise Rites. (Penguin Books/Lantern, Sydney, January 2005)  
 The 10-Minute Rejuvenation Plan- T5T The Revolutionary Exercise Program That Restores Your Body and Mind. (Random House/Clarkson Potter, New York, April 2007)  
 Viis Tiibeti riitust illustratsioonidega. (Ersen, Estonia, October 2018) 
 Double Agent Celery - MI5's Crooked Hero. (Pen & Sword Books, UK, October 2017)

Award 
Her book, Double Agent Celery - MI5's Crooked Hero  won the 2018 non-fiction award - Society of Women Writers NSW. Inc.

Early years 

Witt was born in Kenya. She attended Loreto Convent Msongari in Nairobi and represented Kenya in two international swimming competitions where she broke three national records: Kenya Junior Record, Girls 12 & Under 200 metres Backstroke; the Kenya Junior Record, and the Zambian Age Group All-Comers Record for the 100 metres backstroke.

In 1968 she continued her training with the former West German Freestyle Champion, with a view to competing in the Munich Olympics in 1972. In 1969 she broke her left shoulder in an accident putting an end to her swimming career and shortly afterwards her family moved to South Africa followed by the West Indies, England and Australia.

In 1984 Witt and her husband who individually tailored home dialysis equipment and supplies to  patients throughout the United Kingdom, sold their company Unicare Medical Services, to Baxter Travenol Laboratories, part of the US Health Care Company Baxter International Inc and moved to Australia.

Ballooning 
Witt was 20 years old when she began hot air ballooning in England. She became a commercial hot air balloon pilot and competed in a number of national and international balloon competitions. In 1979, she and another balloon pilot, Lady Gwen Bellew attempted to become the first female balloon pilots to cross the English Channel, sponsored by Famous Grouse Whiskey. They were pipped at the post by another female pilot who got wind of their attempt and managed to beat them to the finish.

Witt, together with her friend Sheila Scott, the famous aviator who amongst her 100 flying records flew solo over the North Pole in 1956, flew her balloon throughout the UK drawing attention to the plight of otters whose habitat was being destroyed.

In 1988 Witt flew Richard Branson's Virgin Jumbo Jet shaped balloon  from Perth to Sydney in the Australian Bicentenary Trans-Australia balloon race. As part of the pre-race publicity, Witt and her crew tethered a red Virgin balloon to a barge, and sailed it fully inflated past the Sydney Opera House, and under the Sydney Harbour Bridge.

The Five Tibetan Rites teaching 

Witt has practiced and studied yoga, meditation and breathing (Pranayama) since she was eighteen. In 2000 she was introduced to The Five Tibetan Rites through a teacher of the Five Rites, and began teaching them in workshops throughout Australia, New Zealand and the USA.

In the beginning, her teaching followed the methodology described by Peter Kelder in his 1939 book The Eye of Revelation, which contains the story of the discovery of the Tibetan monks who developed these movements. However this book contains very limited instructions and illustrations.

Witt developed a step-by-step method that makes the Rites easier and safer to learn, particularly for those who have difficulty with one or more of the movements or for people who need to modify the Rites to suit their individual anatomical variations. An example of this body proportion i.e., the length of the arms versus the length of the trunk in the 4th Rite: people with shorter arms need to prop the hands to complete this movement comfortably.

5 Tibetan rites step by step learning method 
The Five Tibetan Rites are very well known and sought after for their anti-aging, and energy-raising benefits. They were developed at a time when people lived a far more menial lifestyle compared to the largely sedentary western one of today. In teaching the original method in her workshops, Witt noticed a small but recurrent pattern of lower back pain or neck pain developing in a percentage of students, and decided to find ways to prevent it occurring. She consulted chiropractors, physiotherapists, osteopaths, Iyengar Yoga, Pilates, Feldenkrais Method, and Occupation Health Practitioners, and asked them to help her develop a way of learning and practicing the Rites, that would maintain the integrity of the original Rites – but remove the potential for strain or injury. As a result of their input, and the experience gained in the living-laboratory of her classrooms, Witt developed a step-by-step method of learning the Rites that progressively built people's strength & flexibility from the inside out. She called this method "T5T"  which is an abbreviation for The Five Tibetans.

Significant improvement came about when she advised students not to over bend in the lower back and neck as described in the original Kelder book, The Eye of Revelation as this compresses the vertebrae and intervertebral discs. Instead of "lean backward as far as possible; at the same time the head should be lifted and thrown back as far as it will go,"— as Rite No. 3 is described by Kelder — she recommends keeping your spine "long and strong" and to "avoid compression."

Witt added core stability to the Rites. This is an internal movement and is not obvious to a casual observer. People doing the T5T version look the same as those doing the original version except they don't compress the lower back or neck. When core muscles are activated correctly, they completely encircle the spine, stabilizing and supporting it like a natural weight-belt or girdle. People who have a history of back or neck pain, and those with weak core muscles are more prone to injury as their muscles are unable to function correctly in stabilizing and protecting the spine. In T5T, core strength is developed by adding a new muscular challenge to the core muscles every week for the ten weeks it takes to build up to the required 21 repetitions of each movement. Kelder advises beginners to start with just 3 repetitions per week, then add 2 more repetitions per week, until they are doing the required 21 in ten weeks’ time.

To reduce stress and anxiety in normal daily life as well as improve vitality and health, Witt incorporated a greater focus on breathing while practicing the Rites. In between each Rite a series of three energy raising breaths are carried out which results in a more flexible and adaptive breath for normal life, as well as during the Rites.

Latest writing project 
Witt is the granddaughter of Walter Dicketts, a British double agent code named Celery, who worked for MI5 during World War Two.  Dicketts was sent to Nazi Germany to infiltrate the German Secret Service Abwehr and bring back crucial secrets about an impending British invasion in early 1941.

Dicketts survived an intensive interrogation in Hamburg, where he was drugged  and plied with alcohol, but still managed to convince the Germans he was a traitor willing to sell out his country for cash, when in reality he was working for MI5. When Dicketts returned to England, his testimony resulted in the imprisonment of Britain's first double agent Snow.,  MI5 subsequently sent Dicketts back to neutral Lisbon to help an Abwehr officer to defect, and then to South America shortly before the Japanese invaded Pearl Harbour.

Walter Dicketts married four times and maintained two mistresses during two of those marriages. Witt is the granddaughter of his first mistress Dora Guerrier. In World War One, he enlisted with the RNAS at the age of 15  serving in armoured cars and tanks before becoming a pilot. After an accident rendered him unfit for further flying, Dicketts worked in Air Intelligence at the Air Ministry. Dicketts served several prison sentences for fraud following his release into civilian life at the end of both World Wars.

Witt has spent seven years researching and writing Walter Dicketts’ biography, called Double Agent Celery: MI5's Crooked Hero.

Ballooning highlights 
 28 Aug 1977 — Obtained Hot Air Balloon Pilots Licence in a Cameron 77 balloon "Tsuru", Registration No: GBCXM. 
 25 June 1977 — 2nd place Towry Law Balloon Race, Longleat Safari Park
 1977 Crew — UK National Hot Air Balloon Championship in "Tsuru" balloon. 
 1979 — Record Attempt in Cameron 77 balloon "Famous Grouse Whiskey" Registration No: GLOAG with Lady Gwendoline Bellew to be first women to fly across the English Channel from Bristol to France. 
 May 1978 — Won Anglo French Meet in Vittel France with pilot Chris Kirby, in an all red Cameron 77 balloon called Moulin Rouge G-BFNH.
 30 May 1979 — Flew Moulin Rouge C77 balloon for Queensway Discount Store advert.
 1979 Crew — UK National Hot Air Balloon Championship in a Cameron N56 balloon "Valor" Registration No: GBEXZ.  
 1979 — Commercial Balloon Pilot for "The Balloon Stable" Company in UK in Cameron V56 "Hot Lips" Registration No: GBDUZ. 
 31 March 1979 — Flew Anglo French Meet in Maintenon France with pilot Martin Moroney, in Cameron C56N "Valor".   
 17 June 1979 — Flew famous aviator Sheila Scott from Sudely Castle  in a Thunder 56 balloon "Argonaut" Registration No:G- BDVG.
 15 January 1981 — First flight in eponymously named blue Cameron 42 called Carolinda, Registration No G-BIGC. 
 1988 – Competed in Australian Bicentennial Trans-Australia Balloon Race piloting jumbo jet shaped Virgin balloon, GUMBO.

Sources that reference Witt's work 
 Wall Street Journal - Five Best: Helen Fry on Books About Clandestine Agents in World War II
5 Tibetan Rites for Energy, Strength and Lasting Power — Ultra Fitness Magazine
The daring and scandalous life of British double agent ‘Celery’, ABC Radio Program 'Conversations' with Richard Fidler and Sarah Kanowski
 Get Recharged -Flick on your energy switch and get centered with this ancient 10-minute yoga routine Natural Health Magazine 
 Five Alive — The Five Tibetan Exercise Rites Offer An Attractive Equation The Alaska Club Online Fitness Magazine 
 Ageless Tibetan Secrets Revealed New Connexion
 The 10-Minute Rejuvenation Plan — T5T: The Revolutionary Exercise Program That Restores Your Body and Mind 
 Hot Air Ballooning  (Pierson & Co, Australia) by David Iggulden with foreword by Richard Branson, Pages 52, 56, 67
 A Spy Who Stayed Out In The Cold Sydney Morning Herald 
 Delving into the tale of the war-time MI5 double agent The Monmouthshire Beacon

References 

1955 births
Living people
Writers from Nairobi
Kenyan women writers
Reiki practitioners
Kenyan people of English descent
Kenyan emigrants to Australia
Australian people of English descent